Giovanni Battista Casale (died 1536) was a Roman Catholic prelate who served as Bishop of Belluno (1527–1536).

Biography
On 18 September 1527, Giovanni Battista Casale was appointed during the papacy of Pope Clement VII as Bishop of Belluno.
He served as Bishop of Belluno until his death in Sep 1536.

References

External links and additional sources
 (for Chronology of Bishops) 
 (for Chronology of Bishops)  

16th-century Italian Roman Catholic bishops
Bishops appointed by Pope Clement VII
1536 deaths